Alaria americana is a species of a trematode in a family Diplostomidae. All of these species infect carnivorous mammals by living in their small intestines as mature worms. A. americana are most frequently found in temperate regions, predominately in northern North America. This organisms habit is extremely diverse, as it occupies four different hosts throughout its lifetime. This trematode thrives in areas close to water as it is needed for several developmental stages to occur. A. americana has been isolated to the different North American mammals with a wide range of definitive hosts, including cattle, lynx, martens, skunks, bobcats, foxes, coyotes, and wolves.

Description 
This trematode is very small in size being no bigger than 6mm in length and 2mm in width. The anterior portion of the fluke is flat whereas the posterior half has a cylindrical shape. It has two small suckers that are about 100 um wide to aide in absorption and digestion of nutrients. as is common with other flukes, they have no external signs of segmentation. The mouth ends in the pharynx that allows for sucking. The digestive tract is blind, meaning it has no rectum, and is not linear, as in most animals, but branched, ending in several blind ducts.

Reproduction 
This species is monoecious, meaning it has both male and female reproductive organs, which are found within each individual trematode, consisting of a single ovary and testes. It reproduces in the definitive host and then passes unembryonated eggs in the feces. A key reproductive feature is that they are oviparous which means the female releases the eggs and the development of offspring occurs outside the mother's body. There is no parental investment from the trematode beyond the release of its eggs.

Habitat 
The habitat of A. americana is extremely diverse. This trematode thrives in many different temperate locations. Habitat regions include: tropical, terrestrial, and freshwater locations. Terrestrial Biomes include: forests, rainforests, and mountains. Aquatic Biomes include: lakes, ponds, rivers, streams, and temporary pools. Wetlands include: marshes and swamps. Other habitat features include: urban areas, the suburbs, and agricultural areas.

Life cycle 
Alaria americana is a three- host trematode that lives as adults in the intestine of the dog definitive host. Eggs are passed in faeces and hatch in water, releasing miracidia which penetrate the helisomid freshwater snails (first intermediate host) and develop through the sporocyst stage into cercariae. Cercariae released from snails actively penetrate the second intermediate host (tadpoles) becoming infective mesocercariae in about two weeks. In the tadpole or in the frogs (following the metamorphosis), mesocercariae accumulate and may be ingested by a number of paratenic hosts (e.g., other frogs, snakes) or directly by the definitive host.

Human infections 
Cases of human intraocular infection with mesocercariae of Alaria americana and other Alaria mesocercariae have been recorded in patients who had ingested undercooked contaminated frog legs. Both patients presented with pigmentary tracks in the retina, areas of active or healed retinitis and signs of diffuse unilateral subacute neuroretinitis.

Animal infections 
While it is not common for A. americana to infect common household animals, dogs and cats can get this infection. This may go unnoticed though since it is harmless and asymptomatic to these animals. It can be acquired by drinking contaminated water infested with eggs that have released miracidia larvae that are highly motile. If household animals do in fact become infected, humans do not need to worry about getting infected themselves because Alaria flukes are not contagious for humans, neither through contact or through ingesting their feces.

References 
This article incorporates CC-BY-2.0 text from the reference

External links 
 Alaria americana at Animal Diversity Web
 
 

Diplostomida